KIIC (96.7 FM) is a commercial radio station that serves 19 counties in Southern Iowa.  The station broadcasts a Real Country format.  KIIC is licensed to Waveguide Communications Inc which is owned by Joe Milledge.

The station was originally licensed as KLBA-FM on November 18, 1992, but changed callsigns to KIIC on August 7, 2007.

The transmitter and broadcast tower are located 3 miles east of Albia.

KIIC specializes in local, regional and national sports, local news and weather - with an emphasis on Agriculture.   KIIC is also known for its local events like BaconTown, The Farm Show, and Ottumwa's Bridgefest.

External links
 KIIC website

IIC